Željko Poljak  (born 29 April 1959) is a Croatian basketball coach and former basketball player who competed for Yugoslavia at European Championships 1981 and 1983. He was born in Crikvenica.

References

1959 births
Living people
Croatian men's basketball players
KK Split players
Basketball players from Rijeka
Yugoslav men's basketball players
Mediterranean Games medalists in basketball
Mediterranean Games silver medalists for Yugoslavia
Competitors at the 1979 Mediterranean Games
Power forwards (basketball)
KK Kvarner players
KK Zagreb players
KK Cibona players